Erzincan Province is a province in the Eastern Anatolia Region of Turkey. In Turkey, its capital is also called Erzincan. The population was 236,034 in 2018.

Geography
Erzincan is traversed by the northeasterly line of equal latitude and longitude. It lies on the Northern Anatolian Fault, where it is often the location for earthquakes such as on 27 December 1939 and 13 March 1992.

Districts

Erzincan province is divided into 9 districts (capital district in bold):
Çayırlı
Erzincan
İliç
Kemah
Kemaliye
Otlukbeli
Refahiye
Tercan
Üzümlü

History 
In September 1935 the third Inspectorate General (Umumi Müfettişlik, UM) was created, into which the Erzincan province was included. Its creation was based on the Law 1164 from June 1927, which was passed in order to Turkefy the population. The Erzincan province was included in this area. The third UM span over the provinces of Erzurum, Artvin, Rize, Trabzon, Kars, Gümüşhane, Erzincan and Ağrı. It was governed by an Inspector General seated in the city of Erzurum. In January 1936, a Fourth Inspectorate-General was established, under which authority the province was transferred. The fourth UM included the provinces of Erzincan, Tunceli, Elazığ and the areas which would become the province of Bingöl. The Fourth UM was governed by a Governor Commander. Most of the employees in the municipalities were to be from the military and the Governor Commander had the authority to evacuate whole villages and resettle them in other areas. The Inspectorates General were dissolved in 1952 during the Government of the Democrat Party.

See also
1939 Erzincan earthquake
List of populated places in Erzincan Province
Battle of Otlukbeli Martyrs' Monument

References

External links

  Erzincan governor's official website
  Erzincan municipality's official website
  Erzincan weather forecast information

 
Provinces of Turkey